The Albatros course at Le Golf National  is an 18-hole golf course in France, near Paris. Designed by architects Hubert Chesneau and Robert Von Hagge, in collaboration with Pierre Thevenin, it is located in Guyancourt, southwest of central Paris.

Facilities 

Construction began  in July 1987, and it debuted over three years later, on 5 October 1990, opened by Roger Bambuck, Minister of Youth and Sports.

Le Golf National has a capacity for 80,000 spectators.

Tournaments 
Le Golf National hosts the Open de France on the European Tour,  the oldest national open in continental Europe. First played at Le Golf National in 1991, it has been held there every year since, except on two occasions (1999, 2001). 

Le Golf National hosted the Ryder Cup in 2018.

The facility is scheduled to host the golfing competition during the Olympics in 2024.

References

External links
 
 
2018 Ryder Cup – official site

Golf clubs and courses in France
Sports venues in Yvelines
Ryder Cup venues
Olympic golf venues
Venues of the 2024 Summer Olympics
1990 establishments in France
Sports venues completed in 1990